Microseris lanceolata is an Australian alpine herb with yellow flowers and one of three plants known as murnong or yam daisy along with Microseris scapigera and Microseris walteri. 

The plant is found in southern parts of Australia, including Victoria, NSW and ACT. In Victoria, the plant is confined to alpine and subalpine herbfields of the eastern ranges, and often locally plentiful. Microseris walteri and Microseris scapigera are found in lower altitude areas. 

Commercial plant nurseries will often mislabel a  Microseris scapigera plant with the name of Microseris lanceolata, because the binomial name was only clarified in recent years. Literature about Murnong often misidentifies  Microseris lanceolata as having a sweet-tasting tuber, but this refers to the Microseris walteri plant.

Botanical naming 

For more than 30 years murnong was named as Microseris sp. or Microseris lanceolata or Microseris scapigera. Royal Botanic Gardens Victoria botanist Neville Walsh clarified the botanical name of Microseris walteri in 2016 and defined the differences in the three species in the table below.

Biological descriptions
Microseris lanceolata has the form of a tufted rosette of toothed lanceolate leaves. 

The flower is a yellow head of florets, similar to flatweed (Hypochaeris radicata) or dandelion (Taraxacum). In its natural alpine and subalpine environment, the flower begins to blossom in December when the temperature reaches about 20C. The flower stalk is pendulous before flowering, becoming erect for flowering to attract pollinators and again with the ripening of the seed head. The seed heads ripen to a cluster of fluffy, tan achenes, each having a crown of fine extensions called a pappus. The seeds are dispersed by wind.  

The plant has several fleshy roots branching just below ground level, rather than a tuber like Microseris walteri.

Cultivation and uses
The edible tuberous roots of murnong plants were an important source of food for some Aboriginal Australian peoples. However, the descriptions of murnong are more closely aligned with Microseris walteri. To add to the confusion, commercial nurseries will commonly mislabel a Microseris scapigera plant as Microseris lanceolata.

Gallery

References

lanceolata
Asterales of Australia
Flora of Victoria (Australia)
Root vegetables
Plants described in 1840